This list is of the Historic Sites of Japan located within the Prefecture of Fukuoka.

National Historic Sites
As of 1 December 2020, ninety-seven Sites have been designated as being of national significance (including five *Special Historic Sites); Kii Castle spans the prefectural borders with Saga and the Mitsui Miike Coal Mine Sites those with Kumamoto.

| align="center"|Kurume Domain Arima Clan GravesKurume-han-shu Arima-ke bosho || Kurume || at Bairin-ji ||  ||  || || 
|-
|}

Prefectural Historic Sites
As of 1 May 2020, eighty Sites have been designated as being of prefectural importance.

Municipal Historic Sites
As of 1 May 2020, a further two hundred and nineteen Sites have been designated as being of municipal importance.

See also

 Cultural Properties of Japan
 Chikugo Province
 Chikuzen Province
 Buzen Province
 List of Places of Scenic Beauty of Japan (Fukuoka)
 List of Cultural Properties of Japan - paintings (Fukuoka)
 Kyushu National Museum
 Kyushu Historical Museum

References

External links
 Cultural Properties of Fukuoka Prefecture 

Fukuoka Prefecture
 Fukuoka